Gerald M. Davis (born 1936) is an American politician from Maine.

Career 
Davis, a Republican from Falmouth, represented District 11 in the Maine Senate from 2008 to 2010. He was defeated for re-election in 2010 by unenrolled (independent) Richard Woodbury of Yarmouth. Davis' Senate district covered part of Cumberland County, specifically Chebeague Island, Cumberland, Falmouth, Gray, Long Island, North Yarmouth and Yarmouth. He served in the Maine House of Representatives from 1996 to 2006. He also served on the Falmouth School Board.

He taught history at Portland High School and served as a Peace Corps volunteer.

A Roman Catholic, Davis opposed redefining marriage to include same sex marriage.

Education 
Davis earned a B.A. from Bates College and an MA in history and education from the University of Southern Maine.

References

1936 births
Living people
People from Falmouth, Maine
Bates College alumni
University of Southern Maine alumni
Republican Party Maine state senators
School board members in Maine
Peace Corps volunteers
Republican Party members of the Maine House of Representatives
21st-century American politicians
Catholics from Maine